Karan-Kunkas (Qaran-Quñqaś) is a rural locality (a selo) and the administrative centre of Karanovsky Selsoviet, Miyakinsky District, Bashkortostan, Russia. The population was 407 as of 2010. There are 7 streets.

Geography 
Karan-Kunkas is located 32 km northeast of Kirgiz-Miyaki (the district's administrative centre) by road. Kul-Kunkas is the nearest rural locality.

References 

Rural localities in Miyakinsky District